James Battle may refer to:

Jim Battle (baseball), baseball player
Jim Battle (American football)
James Battle (fireboat)

See also
Jim Battle (American football)